The Divide: American Injustice in the Age of the Wealth Gap is a 2014 non-fiction book by journalist Matt Taibbi about wealth inequality in the United States and its impact on the American conception of justice and the legal system.

Overview
Published by Spiegel & Grau, the book illustrates the "divide" by looking at the relationship between growing income inequality and the criminalization of poverty, as poor people are increasingly harassed, arrested and imprisoned for minor crimes in the U.S., sometimes for no actual crime at all, even as crime rates continue to plummet, resulting in a prison population that "is now the biggest in the history of human civilization."  At the same time, Taibbi writes, white-collar criminals who continue to defraud the financial system avoid punishment, allowing them to accumulate even more wealth without fear of future prosecution.  Taibbi argues that as a result of this divide, money has now redefined the meaning of justice, distorting the very notion of American citizenship and challenging the founding ideals of its nation.  The Los Angeles Times called the book "advocacy journalism at its finest, an attempt to stir us up."

See also
Causes of the Great Recession
Government policies and the subprime mortgage crisis
Incarceration in the United States

References

Further reading
Doctorow, Cory (June 2, 2014). Matt Taibbi's The Divide: incandescent indictment of the American justice-gap. Boing Boing. Retrieved June 15, 2014.
McEvers, Kelly. (April 6, 2014). In Book's Trial of U.S. Justice System, Wealth Gap is Exhibit A. All Things Considered. NPR. 
Emily Tess Katz (April 16, 2014). Matt Taibbi: America Has A 'Profound Hatred Of The Weak And The Poor'. The Huffington Post.
 Elias Isquith. (May 19, 2014). “It’s total moral surrender”: Matt Taibbi unloads on Wall Street, inequality and our broken justice system. Salon.com.

External links
Q&A interview with Taibbi on The Divide, April 6, 2014, C-SPAN
Presentation by Taibbi on The Divide, April 17, 2014, C-SPAN

2014 non-fiction books
Books about the United States
Economic inequality in the United States
Non-fiction books about the Great Recession
Poverty in the United States
Wealth in the United States
Books by Matt Taibbi
Spiegel & Grau books